These are the official results of the Women's shot put event at the 2002 European Championships in Munich, Germany. There were a total number of fifteen participating athletes. There was no the qualification round. The final was held on Saturday August 10, 2002.

Medalists

Schedule
All times are Central European Time (UTC+1)

Abbreviations
All results shown are in metres

Records

Final

See also
 1999 Women's World Championships Shot Put (Seville)
 2000 Women's Olympic Shot Put (Sydney)
 2001 Women's World Championships Shot Put (Edmonton)
 2002 Shot Put Year Ranking
 2003 Women's World Championships Shot Put (Paris)
 2004 Women's Olympic Shot Put (Athens)
 2005 Women's World Championships Shot Put (Helsinki)

References
 Results
 todor66

Shot put
Shot put at the European Athletics Championships
2002 in women's athletics